The Nicaragua national baseball team (Spanish: Selección de béisbol de Nicaragua) is the national baseball team of Nicaragua. Considered the best in Central America along with Panama, it represents Nicaragua in international tournaments. Nicaragua has a long history at the Baseball World Cup, hosting it five times and earning five second-place finishes, the last in 1990. 30 Nicaraguans have signed professional contracts in the Major League Baseball. Nicaragua qualified for the World Baseball Classic for the first time in 2023. They have participated at the Olympic Games twice in 1984 and 1996. Also, they have participated at the Pan American Games five times in 1983, 1995, 2007, 2015, and 2019. The team tried but failed to qualify for the 2020 Olympics at the eight-team Americas Qualifying Event on May 31 through June 5, 2021. The team will next compete in the 2023 World Baseball Classic in March 11-15, 2023 in Miami, Florida, against Team Israel, Team Puerto Rico, Team Dominican Republic, and Team Venezuela.

Results and fixtures
The following is a list of professional baseball match results currently active in the latest version of the WBSC World Rankings, as well as any future matches that have been scheduled.

Legend

2019

2022

2023

Current roster

Tournament results

World Baseball Classic

Olympic Games

The team tried but failed to qualify for the 2020 Olympics at the Americas Qualifying Event on May 31 through June 5, 2021.

Baseball World Cup

Pan American Games
  :  2nd
  :  2nd
  :  3rd
  :  3rd

Intercontinental Cup
  : 4th
  :  3rd
  : 4th
  : 4th
  : 6th
  : 7th
  : 7th
  :  3rd
  :  3rd
  : 4th
  :  3rd

Central American and Caribbean Games
  :  2nd
  :  3rd
  :  3rd
  :  2nd
  :  2nd
  :  3rd
  :  2nd

Central American Games
  :  1st
  :  1st
  :  2nd
  :  1st
  :  2nd
  :  1st
  :  1st
  :  2nd
  :  1st
  :  1st

References

National baseball teams
Baseball
Baseball in Nicaragua